is a live album by Japanese pop band Pizzicato Five. It was released on March 21, 1993 by the Nippon Columbia imprint Triad. The album was reissued by Readymade Records on March 31, 2006.

Track listing

Charts

References

External links
 

1993 live albums
Pizzicato Five albums
Nippon Columbia live albums
Albums recorded at Nakano Sun Plaza
Japanese-language live albums